Mount Fitzgerald is the name for several mountains and places including:

 Mount Fitzgerald (British Columbia) in British Columbia, Canada
 Mount Fitzgerald (Yukon) in Yukon, Canada
 Mount Fitzgerald (Christchurch), Christchurch, New Zealand
 Mount Fitzgerald (Nevada) in Nevada, USA
 Mount Fitzgerald Reserve, Pigeon Bay, Christchurch